Juan Carlos Raudales Martínez (born 15 July 1979) is a Honduran footballer who currently plays for Atlético Choloma.

Club career
Raudales made his professional debut on 8 September 1996 for F.C. Motagua against Platense F.C. and, up to May 2009, played 184 matches for several Honduran national league teams.

In June 2009 he rejoined Vida and in 2011 he suffered the taste of relegation with Hispano. He then moved to Atlético Choloma.

International career
Raudales played for Honduras at the 1999 FIFA World Youth Championship in Nigeria. He made his senior debut for Honduras in a July 2001 friendly match against Ecuador which proved to be his only international match.

References

External links

 Profile - Diez 

1979 births
Living people
Sportspeople from Tegucigalpa
Association football defenders
Honduran footballers
F.C. Motagua players
C.D. Olimpia players
C.D.S. Vida players
C.D. Victoria players
Hispano players
Atlético Choloma players
Liga Nacional de Fútbol Profesional de Honduras players
Honduras international footballers